Pennsylvania's 30th congressional district was one of Pennsylvania's districts of the United States House of Representatives.

Geography
From 1903 to 1923 the district was located around Pittsburgh, Pennsylvania.  From 1923 to 1933 the district was located around Bethlehem, Pennsylvania.  From 1943 to 1955 the district was located west of Pittsburgh, Pennsylvania.

History
This district was created in 1903.  The district was eliminated in 1963.

List of representatives

References

 
 
 Congressional Biographical Directory of the United States 1774–present

30
Former congressional districts of the United States
1903 establishments in Pennsylvania
1963 disestablishments in Pennsylvania
Constituencies established in 1903
Constituencies disestablished in 1963